Lemon Grove is a city in San Diego County, California, United States. The population was 27,627 at the 2020 census, up from 25,320 at the 2010 census.

History
The area that eventually became Lemon Grove was part of Mission San Diego de Alcalá, one of the Spanish missions in California. After Mexico became independent from Spain, the Californios (residents of Alta California) ranched on various land grants. The area that now includes Lemon Grove was granted to Santiago Argüello, who received more than 59,000 acres.

The first proprietor of Lemon Grove, Robert Allison, arrived in the region in 1850, coming from Sacramento.  He purchased thousands of acres from Santiago Argüello's heirs; this land eventually became Lemon Grove, La Mesa, Encanto, and part of Spring Valley. Allison became a director and stockholder of the San Diego and Cuyamaca Railroad in 1886 and built the Allison Flume. Allison's son Joseph filed subdivision maps for "Lemon Grove" in 1892. The name is attributed to Joseph's mother, Tempa Waterman Allison.  The climate was suitable for the cultivation of subtropical fruits and vegetables, and farmers from the East and Midwest flocked to the region. The Lemon Grove Fruit Growers Association was formed in 1893; in 1894, the San Diego Union newspaper referred to Lemon Grove as "a sea of lemon trees."

Joseph and Anton Sonka, immigrants from Bohemia, moved to Lemon Grove after stints in Seguin, Texas, and San Diego. The brothers opened a well-known general store, A. Sonka and Son.  Anthony "Tony" F. Sonka, the eldest son of Anton Sonka and his German American wife Anna Klein Sonka, was also a local notable. He was a key supporter of the huge lemon that became the town's symbol and landmark. Sonka and a committee of local ranchers hired local architect Alberto Treganza to build the huge lemon to "make the ultimate statement about the town's purpose, prosperity, and optimism."

In the Lemon Grove Incident in 1931, Mexican American parents in Lemon Grove pursued a successful judicial challenge against the decision of the local school board to build a separate school for Mexican American pupils. The decision of the Superior Court for San Diego County in Alvarez v. Lemon Grove was the first successful lawsuit against school segregation.

By World War II, most of the citrus groves had disappeared and suburbanization had begun. There had been four elections on incorporation from the 1950s to the 1970s; the issue caused heated debate in the town. The city was finally incorporated on July 1, 1977, becoming California's 414th city. Lemon Grove was incorporated as a general-law city; however, it continues to receive law enforcement services, via contract, from the San Diego County Sheriff's Department.

Geography
Lemon Grove is located at  (32.733451, −117.033702).

Transportation
The city is served by California State Routes 94 and 125. It is also served by the San Diego Trolley's Orange Line, at Lemon Grove Depot as well as at Massachusetts Avenue Station.

Demographics

2010
At the 2010 census Lemon Grove had a population of 25,320. The racial makeup of Lemon Grove was 8,545 (33.3%) White, 3,495 (13.8%) African American, 225 (0.9%) Native American, 1,628 (6.3%) Asian, 275 (1.1%) Pacific Islander, 4,828 (19.1%) from other races, and 1,801 (7.1%) from two or more races. Hispanic or Latino of any race were 11,635 persons (45.2%).

The census reported that 24,974 people (98.6% of the population) lived in households, 200 (0.8%) lived in non-institutionalized group quarters, and 146 (0.6%) were institutionalized.

There were 8,434 households, 3,295 (39.1%) had children under the age of 18 living in them, 3,863 (45.8%) were opposite-sex married couples living together, 1,419 (16.8%) had a female householder with no husband present, 601 (7.1%) had a male householder with no wife present. There were 516 (6.1%) unmarried opposite-sex partnerships, and 94 (1.1%) same-sex married couples or partnerships. 1,928 households (22.9%) were one person and 734 (8.7%) had someone living alone who was 65 or older. The average household size was 2.96. There were 5,883 families (69.8% of households); the average family size was 3.51.

The age distribution was 6,458 people (25.5%) under the age of 18, 2,583 people (10.2%) aged 18 to 24, 6,900 people (27.3%) aged 25 to 44, 6,550 people (25.9%) aged 45 to 64, and 2,829 people (11.2%) who were 65 or older. The median age was 35.0 years. For every 100 females, there were 95.3 males.  For every 100 females age 18 and over, there were 93.6 males.

There were 8,868 housing units at an average density of 2,285.4 per square mile, of the occupied units 4,609 (54.6%) were owner-occupied and 3,825 (45.4%) were rented. The homeowner vacancy rate was 2.0%; the rental vacancy rate was 5.0%.  13,984 people (55.2% of the population) lived in owner-occupied housing units and 10,990 people (43.4%) lived in rental housing units.

2000
At the 2000 census there were 24,918 people in 8,488 households, including 5,958 families, in the city. The population density was 6,557.3 inhabitants per square mile (2,531.8/km). The racial makeup of the city was 33.7% White, 13.9% African American, 0.4% Native American, 6.7% Asian, 0.8% Pacific Islander, 13.5% from other races, and 7.1% from two or more races. Hispanic or Latino of any race were 45.3%.

Of the 8,488 households 36.4% had children under the age of 18 living with them, 49.0% were married couples living together, 15.6% had a female householder with no husband present, and 29.8% were non-families. 22.4% of households were one person and 8.9% were one person aged 65 or older. The average household size was 2.87 and the average family size was 3.36.

The age distribution was 27.6% under the age of 18, 9.0% from 18 to 24, 30.9% from 25 to 44, 20.5% from 45 to 64, and 12.0% 65 or older. The median age was 35 years. For every 100 females, there were 93.9 males. For every 100 females age 18 and over, there were 91.0 males.

The median household income was $39,823 and the median family income  was $45,844. Males had a median income of $35,042 versus $28,509 for females. The per capita income for the city was $17,002. About 9.2% of families and 13.7% of the population were below the poverty line, including 18.0% of those under age 18 and 5.9% of those age 65 or over.

Current estimates 
According to estimates by the San Diego Association of Governments, the median household income of Lemon Grove in 2005 was $55,436 (not adjusted for inflation). When adjusted for inflation (1999 dollars; comparable to Census data above), the median household income was $45,016.

Government

The City Council includes Mayor Racquel Vasquez, and Council members George Gastil, Alysson Snow, Liana LeBaron and Jennifer Mendoza. The City Manager is Lydia Romero.

Notable people
 Rob Crow, American musician
 Rob $tone, Rapper
 John Forester, cycling activist, author and cycling transportation engineer
 Actor Dennis Hopper, around age 13.
 Mary Moore (1922–1962), All-American Girls Professional Baseball League player, a native of Lemon Grove
Conan Gray, American singer-songwriter and social media personality
 Abdussattar Shaikh, Cofounder of San Diego's Islamic Center
"Shotgun Tom" Kelly, radio personality
Lalo Alcaraz, cartoonist 
 Boyd Rice, American musician, artist, photographer and author

"The World's Biggest Lemon"  
Weighing some 3000 pounds, and approximately 10 feet long and six feet wide, the lemon sculpture—affectionately known as the World's Biggest Lemon—sits on a concrete base at the corner of Broadway and Lemon Grove Avenue, adjacent to 3361 Main Street. It lies before a small lemon grove beside the Orange Line Trolley tracks near the local trolley station and downtown bus stop. Written across the base of this monument are the words "Best Climate On Earth". Designed by Lemon Grove architect Alberto O Treganza, the lemon was originally built as a parade float for the 1928 Fourth of July Fiesta de San Diego parade, carrying the town's first Miss Lemon Grove, Amorita Treganza, Alberto's 16-year-old daughter. In 1930, the float was plastered to create a permanent sculpture and displayed near its current location.

Education 
Public primary education in the city is provided by the Lemon Grove School District. Grossmont Union High School District provides secondary and adult education.

High schools
Eligible students are sent outside the town for secondary education.

Middle schools 
Lemon Grove Academy Middle School

K-8 schools
Vista La Mesa Academy
Mount Vernon School

Elementary schools
Lemon Grove Academy Elementary School
Monterey Heights Elementary School
San Altos Elementary School
San Miguel Elementary School

See also

References

External links
 
 City Data
 Lemon Grove Historical Society - Official Website

 
Cities in San Diego County, California
East County (San Diego County)
San Diego metropolitan area
Incorporated cities and towns in California
Chicano and Mexican neighborhoods in California